Harold W. Zent (1900 – August 24, 1951) was an American politician in the state of Washington. He served in the Washington House of Representatives from 1941 to his death in 1951 for district 6.

References

1951 deaths
1900 births
Republican Party members of the Washington House of Representatives
20th-century American politicians
People from Ritzville, Washington